The 1907–08 season  was Madrid Football Club's 6th season in existence. The club played some friendly matches. They also played in the Campeonato Regional de Madrid (Madrid Regional Championship) and the Copa del Rey. Madrid FC won both competitions for the fourth consecutive season becoming the first club to achieve the feat.

Friendlies

Competitions

Overview

Campeonato Regional de Madrid

League table

Matches

Copa del Rey

References

External links
Realmadrid.com Official Site

Real Madrid
Real Madrid CF seasons